Julian Medforth Budden  (9 April 1924 in Hoylake, Wirral – 28 February 2007 in Florence, Italy) was a British opera scholar, radio producer and broadcaster. He is particularly known for his three volumes on the operas of Giuseppe Verdi (published in 1973, 1978, and 1981), a single-volume biography in 1982 and a single-volume work on Giacomo Puccini and his operas in 2002. He is also the author of numerous entries in the Grove Dictionary of Music and Musicians.

Personal life
His parents were the then professor of architecture at Liverpool University, Lionel Budden, and a poet, writer and journalist Maud, (née Fraser) who from 1938 until 1964 provided the rhymes for the strip Curly Wee and Gussie Goose, which was syndicated in newspapers throughout the world.  Neither of his parents was especially musical and were not interested in what little opera was available locally. His operatic awakening occurred at school when a touring company with piano accompaniment and spoken recitatives performed The Marriage of Figaro.

He attended Stowe School and read Classics at Queen's College Oxford. The war interrupted his studies; he worked in the Friends' Ambulance Unit from 1943–46, serving in Austria and Italy. He completed his BA in 1948 and then studied piano (with Thornton Lofthouse) and bassoon (with Archie Camden) at the Royal College of Music.

Career
From 1951 until 1983 Budden worked for the BBC, progressing from junior posts to become a producer, then Chief Producer of Opera (1970–76) and External Services Music Organizer (1976–83). This time saw many little-known works produced and important revivals, including the original versions of Macbeth, La forza del destino and Simon Boccanegra and the full French version of Don Carlos. He also produced programmes for others, and was meticulous in checking scripts and encouraging contributions.

Concurrently Budden pursued a career as a writer, starting with the BBC publication, The Listener. Then came his major study of Verdi, built on the foundation of "patient archival research, practical musicianship, a sense of history and wide cultural sympathies", with every opera covered by a detailed discussion of the literary background, compositional process, and the music as part of the drama. The books were "free from obscure technical analysis or deconstructionist jargon". His writing style was "generous to past scholars... generous to his readers. [His prose was] full of wit and relaxed communication". Budden was considered a key person in securing the reputation of Verdi during the second half of the twentieth century.

After leaving the BBC he was based in both London and Florence (he spoke fluent Italian), where he was a regular correspondent for Opera magazine and was a presence at the Istituto Nazionale di Studi Verdiani in Parma. He was president of the Centro di Studi Giacomo Puccini in Lucca until his death.

He was made a Fellow of the British Academy in 1987 and appointed an OBE for services to opera in 1991.

Publications
The Operas of Verdi, Volume 1 (3rd edition), New York: Oxford University Press, 1983 
The Operas of Verdi, Volume 2 (3rd edition), New York: Oxford University Press, 1983 
The Operas of Verdi, Volume 3 (3rd edition), New York: Oxford University Press, 1983 
The New Grove Masters of Italian Opera (with others), New York, W.W. Norton, 1981  
Verdi (Master Musicians Series), New York, Weidenfeld & Nicolson, 1986  ; Oxford: Oxford University Press, 1992 
Encounters with Verdi (with Marcello Conati and Richard Stokes), Cornell University Press, 1997  
Puccini: His Life and Works, New York: Oxford University Press, 2002. (4 Editions)

References
Notes

External links
Amis, John,  "Obituary: "Julian Budden: Masterful Guide to Opera's Magic", The Guardian (London), 7 March 2007. Retrieved 3 April 2007

English music critics
Opera critics
Classical music radio presenters
1924 births
2007 deaths
People educated at Stowe School
Alumni of The Queen's College, Oxford
Fellows of the British Academy
People from Hoylake
BBC radio producers
Officers of the Order of the British Empire
British expatriates in Italy
Verdi scholars